Yabula-Yabula (Jabulajabula) in an extinct language of Australia, located in Victoria and New South Wales. Dixon listed it an isolate, but Glottolog evaluates it as a dialect of Yotayota.

References

Yotayotic languages